No Man's Land is a 1987 American crime film written by Dick Wolf directed by Peter Werner, and stars Charlie Sheen, D. B. Sweeney, and Randy Quaid. The plot follows a rookie cop who goes undercover and infiltrates a car theft ring. The film was released on October 23, 1987 and received mixed reviews from critics.

Plot
When an undercover detective is shot dead while investigating a string of Porsche 911 thefts, Lieutenant Vincent Bracey assigns 22-year-old San Diego officer Benjamin "Benjy" Taylor to infiltrate a Porsche garage suspected to be a front for the grand theft auto scheme. Benjy is chosen because of his extensive mechanical knowledge of German cars and his rookie status, which dissuades others from suspecting that he is a cop. Bracey wants Benjy to obtain evidence that millionaire playboy Ted Varrick is the mastermind behind the thefts and the murder of the detective.

Using the alias "Billy Ayles", Benjy moves to Los Angeles and gets a job at Technique Porsche as a mechanic. After Benjy fixes Ted's Porsche one night, the two men become close friends, and Benjy becomes romantically attached to Ted's sister Ann. Benjy also discovers the presence of a rival syndicate led by Frank Martin, which leads him to believe that Ted is not the prime suspect despite Bracey's insistence.

Eventually, Ted brings Benjy into his side business of stealing Porsches, with garage manager Malcolm coordinating the operations. Benjy's first few attempts at stealing cars fail miserably, with Frank's syndicate catching on and slashing his hand as a warning. While doing a job at the mall, Benjy and Ted are confronted by Frank and his thugs, but they manage to lose them in a lengthy car chase. Ted rewards Benjy with a red Porsche that night. The next day, Ted goes to Technique Porsche and finds Malcolm has been murdered. In retaliation, he kills Frank at a night club.

During a phone conversation at a party, corrupt police Lieutenant Curtis Loos - who was hired by Ted to take out the detective in the film's opening - tells Ted about Benjy's real identity. The next night, Ted has Benjy meet Loos at a warehouse for a payoff. When Loos tries to kill Benjy, Ted runs him over to save his friend in spite of what he knows. Later, Benjy stops at Bracey's house to inform him of what happened with Loos, and accuses the Lieutenant of conspiring with him. Bracey kicks Benjy out, but tells him to call in the morning so they can work things out. Benjy drives off, unaware that Ted is nearby, spying on him.

The next day, Benjy's cover is blown in front of Ann when his uncle Mike pays him a visit at his apartment. He goes to Bracey's house, only to find that Ted has murdered him. Ted is preparing to flee the country when Benjy convinces him to meet up at the mall, where he tries to arrest Ted for the murders. Ted refuses to go quietly and a gunfight breaks out; Benjy is wounded, but manages to shoot and kill Ted.

Cast

 Charlie Sheen as Ted Varrick
 D. B. Sweeney as Deputy  Sheriff Benjamin 'Benjy' Taylor / Bill Ayles
 Randy Quaid as Lieutenant Vincent Bracey
 Lara Harris as Ann Varrick
 Bill Duke as Malcolm
 R.D. Call as Frank Martin
 Arlen Dean Snyder as Lieutenant Curtis Loos
 M. Emmet Walsh as Captain Haun
 Al Shannon as Danny
 Bernie Pock as Ridley
 Kenny Endoso as Leon
 James F. Kelly as Brandon
 Lori Butler as Suzanne
 Clare Wren as Deborah
 George Dzundza as Uncle Mike
 Linda Carol as Party Girl
 Danitza Kingsley as Margot
 Peggy McCay as Benjy's Mom
 Linda Shayne as Peggy
 Robert Pierce as Jim
 Claude Earl Jones as Uncle Roy
 Jan Burrell as Aunt Rhea
 Channing Chase as Aunt Fran
 Jessica Puscas as Mary Jean
 Molly Carter as Colleen
 Guy Boyd as Jaws
 Henry G. Sanders as Heath
 Gary Riley as Cal
 Jenny Gago as Tory Bracey
 Scott Lincoln as Bailey
 Tom Santo as Juio
 Michael Riley as Horton
 Denis Hartigan as Duncan
 Brad Pitt as Waiter (uncredited)

Production
Avi Nesher was originally going to direct, but was replaced by Peter Werner just a few days before shooting began, Filming locations that were used included Rodeo Drive in Beverly Hills, the Sunset Strip in West Hollywood, and the waterfront and a warehouse in San Pedro. Extensive shooting was also done at the Westside Pavilion shopping mall in West Los Angeles, and in the parking garage at Filmland Center in Culver City.

During filming of the final scene, Charlie Sheen was knocked unconscious when a squib that hardened overnight detonated at the wrong time. He sustained lacerations to his face and a loss of hearing on one ear that lasted four weeks.

Brad Pitt makes his feature film debut in the movie as an extra. In 2019, Pitt revealed that he was almost fired from the film for trying to ad-lib a line.

Soundtrack
The original music score was composed by Basil Poledouris. Ska band The Untouchables performed live in the first party scene.

Release
The film opened in theaters on October 23, 1987 on 510 screens nationwide.

Reception
On Rotten Tomatoes the film holds an approval rating of 50% based on six reviews, with an average rating of 4.8/10. Metacritic assigned the film a weighted average score of 52 out of 100, based on 10 critics, indicating "mixed or average reviews". Audiences polled by CinemaScore gave the film an average grade of "B" on an A+ to F scale.

Roger Ebert gave the film three out of four stars, saying the movie "has lots of scenes of Sheen and Sweeney stealing cars, and it dwells on the details of their crimes, and the reckless way they risk capture. This is a movie about how money and excitement generate a seduction that can change personal values; it's better and deeper than you might expect."

Home media
No Man's Land was released on DVD by MGM Home Video; its cover has the tagline "Fast, furious... and deadly". The film was released on Blu-ray by Kino International on July 27, 2017.

See also
The Fast and the Furious, a 2001 film with a similar premise

References

External links
 
 

1987 films
1980s chase films
1987 crime drama films
1980s heist films
1980s road movies
American chase films
American crime drama films
American heist films
American independent films
American road movies
Films about automobiles
Films directed by Peter Werner
Films scored by Basil Poledouris
Films set in Los Angeles
Films set in San Diego
Films shot in Los Angeles
Orion Pictures films
1980s English-language films
1980s American films